Gary "Gaz" Regan (September 18, 1951 – November 15, 2019) was a British-born bartender and a bar-writer in the U.S. He was known for his book The Joy of Mixology.

Early life
Regan began tending bar in his parents' British pubs when he was 14. After training as a chef at Courtfield Catering College in Blackpool, he ran a bistro with his wife, Norma. They divorced after two years of marriage, and then he emigrated to New York in 1973.

Career Life
In 1973. He started tending bar in New York City. He tended an Upper East Side bar in Manhattan, after which he became manager of the North Star Pub at South Street Seaport.

After he worked as a bartender over 20 years, he started to write about booze, bars, and bartenders for FoodArts magazine.  His first book The Bartender’s Bible was published in 1991, with his then-wife, Mardee Haidin Regan. Later, he became a cocktail columnist for Wine Enthusiast, Food & Wine and the San Francisco Chronicle.

Regan expanded into the liquor business by developing Regans’ Orange Bitters No.6, made by the Sazerac Company.

Health, Life, Death
In 2003, Regan got a surgery and radiation treatment for cancer of the tongue, so no longer able to grow a full beard, he began wearing his hair long and adopted the Lancashire nickname for Gary, “Gaz.”

In 2008, he got married with his last wife, Amy Gallagher. The relationship was continued until he died.

He died due to pneumonia on November 15, 2019, at a hospital, in Newburgh, N.Y.

Publication
 1001 Mixed Drinks and Everything You Need to Know (1991)
 The Bartender's Bible: 1001 Mixed Drinks and Everything You Need to Know to Set Up Your Bar (1993)
 The Book of Bourbon and Other Fine American Whiskeys (1995)
 New Classic Cocktails (1997)
 Martini Companion: A Connoisseur's Guide (1997)
 Martini (1998)
 The Bourbon Companion: A Connoisseur's Guide (1998)
 The Joy of Mixology: The Consummate Guide to the Bartender’s Craft (2003)
 Gaz Regan's Annual Manual for Bartenders (2011)
 Gaz Regan's ANNUAL MANUAL for Bartenders, 2012 (2012)
 Gaz Regan's 101 Best New Cocktails, Volume III (2012)
 the bartender's GIN compendium (2012)
 The Negroni: A Gaz Regan Notion (2013)
 Gaz Regan's 101 Best New Cocktails, Volume IV (2015)
 The Negroni: Drinking to La Dolce Vita, with Recipes & Lore (2015)
 The Joy of Mixology, Revised and Updated Edition: The Consummate Guide to the Bartender's Craft (2017)

References

1951 births
2019 deaths
Bartenders
American bartenders
British emigrants to the United States
People from Rochdale